Laura Taylor (born 10 September 1999) is an Australian swimmer.

Taylor competed at the 2018 Commonwealth Games where she won a silver medal in the 200 metre butterfly event.

She wants to be a physiotherapist or do something in the medical field. She also placed 5th for Women's 200m Butterfly and 12th for Women's 100m Butterfly, both at the Pan Pacific Swimming Championships in Tokyo, Japan 2018.

References

External links
 
 

1999 births
Living people
Australian female butterfly swimmers
Swimmers from Brisbane
Swimmers at the 2018 Commonwealth Games
Commonwealth Games silver medallists for Australia
Commonwealth Games medallists in swimming
Medalists at the FINA World Swimming Championships (25 m)
20th-century Australian women
21st-century Australian women
Medallists at the 2018 Commonwealth Games